First Team: Juventus is an American and Italian six-part docu-series about the Italian association football club Juventus F.C., which was originally released through Netflix on February 16, 2018. It is the first on-demand series about an association football club on Netflix.

The first three episodes came out on Netflix on 16 February 2018, which followed the club throughout the 2017–18 season, by spending time with the players behind the scenes both on and off the field; the other three episodes were released on 6 July 2018. It featured behind the scenes moments with various Juventus players. The voice of D.B. Sweeney (English) and Tommaso Vittorini (Italian) narrated the series. Significant moments of Juventus' season were documented. The first part of the series featured Juventus' season debut with Cagliari, to the defeats with Barcelona and Lazio, the celebrations for the 120 years of club history with president Andrea Agnelli, and the clashes at the top with Napoli and Internazionale and with the decisive Champions League match against Olympiacos.

The second part of the series featured Juventus' round of 16 and quarter-final Champions League Champions League match-ups against Tottenham and Real Madrid respectively, the team's Serie A loss to Napoli in a tight title race, win over Inter, Coppa Italia Final win over Milan, eventual conquest of the league title secured after a draw with Roma, and final farewell to Juventus captain Gianluigi Buffon after 17 years with Juventus, in the last match of the season against Hellas Verona.

Episodes

References

External links
 
 First Team: Juventus on Netflix

Juventus F.C. in popular culture
2010s Italian television series
2018 American television series debuts
2018 American television series endings
2018 American television seasons
American sports television series
Italian sports television series
Netflix original documentary television series
Association football documentary television series
English-language Netflix original programming
Italian-language Netflix original programming